Ratangarh may refer to:

 Ratangarh, Bijnor - a village in Uttar Pradesh
 Ratangarh, Churu - a town in Rajasthan
 Ratangarh, Neemuch - a town in Madhya Pradesh
 Ratangarh, Datia - a village in Madhya Pradesh
 Ratangad - a village in Maharashtra

pt:Ratangarh